Orłowo  is a coastal district of Gdynia, Poland, located in the southern part of the city.

Orłowo borders the districts of Redłowo and Mały Kack in the north and west, respectively, and the city of Sopot in the south.

Orłowo is best known for the environs of the Orłowo Cliff, pier and beach. Other notable sights include the Żeromski House, where writer Stefan Żeromski lived and worked in 1920, the Kolibki manor and park, a former possession of King John III Sobieski, various historic villas, and a memorial to the Polish 2nd Marine Rifle Regiment, which fought in the area against the German invasion of Poland in 1939. There is also the Kolibki observation tower.

During the German occupation of Poland in World War II, the occupiers operated a small subcamp of the Stutthof concentration camp in the district in 1941–1942.

Transport
The Gdynia Orłowo railway station is located in Orłowo.

References

Districts of Gdynia
Populated coastal places in Poland